USA Ultimate is a not-for-profit organization that serves as the governing body of the sport of ultimate (also known as ultimate Frisbee) in the United States.

It was founded in 1979 as the Ultimate Players Association, but rebranded itself as USA Ultimate on May 25, 2010.  The United States Olympic Committee, empowered to govern amateur sport in the USA per the Ted Stevens Olympic and Amateur Sports Act of 1978, officially recognized USA Ultimate as a Recognized Sport Organization on June 10, 2014.

Overview
Its mission is "to advance the sport of Ultimate in the United States by enhancing and promoting Character, Community, and Competition." Its vision is that "Ultimate is widely known, played, and respected in the United States as a sport that inspires athletic excellence and integrity among participants and fans."

In addition to organizing and supporting national teams to represent the nation in international and world championship competitions, a major focus of USA Ultimate is the Championship Series; it sanctions certain tournaments throughout the year in five divisions (Club, College, Youth, Masters, Beach) and runs the local, regional and/or national championship tournaments at the end of the respective seasons. These events are governed by the 11th Edition Rules. While the national champion is crowned in various divisions of the USA Ultimate Championships, four Canadian teams have won championships over the years in different divisions- Vancouver's Furious George (Club Open), University of British Columbia (College Women's), Stick Dog (Masters Women's), and Winnipeg's MOFO (Youth Club Mixed).

In 2008, the 40th Anniversary of the birth of ultimate, USA Ultimate adopted a Five Year Strategic Plan with input from ultimate players throughout the United States, in hopes of facilitating the growth and evolution of the sport for the next forty years.

Club Competition
The Club division is currently the only competition division that is not restricted by age (like Youth and Masters) nor school enrollment (like High School and College), but is rather subdivided only by gender into Men's (open to any gender and previously called "Open"), Women's, and Mixed (with prescribed gender ratios) gender divisions, which have their regular seasons in the summer and their post-season championship series in the fall.  The first national championship took place in 1979 in State College, Pennsylvania.  The Women's division was added in 1981.  The age-based Masters Open (now Men's) and Women's divisions were added to the Club division in 1991; the Masters Women's division was discontinued in 1997, and the Masters Men's division joined Grandmasters in a separate summer Masters Division in 2012.  The Mixed Division was added in 1998. Club national championship tournaments were held in Sarasota, FL from 2000 through 2012, and in 2013 USA Ultimate began moving around the location, starting with Frisco, TX for 3 years and then Rockford, IL in 2016.  The event returned to Sarasota, FL in 2017, followed by San Diego, CA in 2018 and 2019.

The Triple Crown Tour was established in 2013. The three achievements are: winning the US Open tournament, winning the Pro Flight Finale and winning the national championship.  Previously, finishing the regular season with a #1 season ranking replaced the Pro Flight Finale component.  San Francisco's Revolver in the men's division and Seattle's Mixtape in the mixed division won all three achievements in 2013 and 2017, respectively.

College Competition
The College division is subdivided into Women's and Men's (open to any gender and previously called "Open" despite the vast majority of participants identifying as men) gender divisions, which have their regular season in the winter and spring. Over 300 Open teams and 200 Women's teams took part in the College Championship Series in 2005.  The College Open division was first held in 1984 in Somerville, MA and was won by Stanford University.  The College Women's Division was added in 1987. In fall 2017, USAU added mixed regional tournaments with 5 regions. In 2018, another region was added for a total of 6 regional championship events.

Youth Competition
Originally, the National Youth championship was loosely a high school-based competition, with guidelines determining how many players must be from one high school.  In the early 21st century, USA Ultimate moved more towards a complete high school nationals, which launched in 1998 in Maplewood, NJ.

In 2005, two significant changes were made: High School Nationals was split into Easterns and Westerns, split by the Mississippi river, held in May each year, and a Youth Club Championships was created, for club teams assembled from various cities/regions across North America, held in August each year at the National Sports Center.  Over 24 states currently hold high school ultimate state championship tournaments that are operated by local USA Ultimate Competition State Youth Coordinator volunteer staff.

Masters Competition
The Masters division currently consists of Masters Men, Masters Women and Grandmasters Men's divisions. In 2017, USA Ultimate added Masters Mixed, Grandmasters Women, and Great Grandmasters Men's divisions. To compete in the single gender or the mixed division Masters division, men must be 33 years old and women must be 30 years old. To compete in the Grandmasters division, men must be 40 years old and women must be 37 years old. To compete in the Great Grandmasters division, men must be 50 years old and women must be 45 years or older.  Regional championships are played in the early to mid summer with the national championship occurring in the mid to late summer.

Beach Competition
The Beach division, played on a smaller sand-covered surface with fewer players per side than the grass format, was officially added by USA Ultimate in May 2015 with the introduction of a national championship tournament in Virginia Beach, VA.  The event returned in 2016, and the division added the US Beach Open event in Santa Monica, CA, in November 2016.  In 2017, the division will return both of those events as well as a third new Beach Western Championship event in April in Santa Monica, CA.  Four geographic regions have been established for the East Coast, Great Lakes, Gulf Coast, and West, each with an assigned resident Regional Director volunteer staff position.  However, regional championships have not yet been presented as viable, until the division grows further in size and popularity.  Outreach efforts were established to promote the sand format and point out to organizers that existing sand volleyball courts can be used for modified formats in places that are not coastal or accessible to large public areas of natural flat sand, such as coasts and beaches.

Other programs
Aside from the championship series, several community development programs exist to advance the sport at local and grassroots levels. Event Sanctioning provides insurance, marketing, exposure, connections to rankings for some competition divisions and discounts on materials for tournaments, leagues and training events (like practices, scrimmages, camps, clinics, etc.).  The Affiliate program connects the national office to existing organizations that are dedicated to advancing the sport in a specific metro area.  The State-Based Organization initiative funds and supports the establishment of new state-focused governing bodies to assume the role of the national office with a dedicated focus on a single state or perhaps a few contiguous states, where geography and population dynamics warrant the combination.  New Start Program Grants are given out quarterly to local ultimate organizers who apply for materials to start brand new ultimate programs.

USA Ultimate is run by a thirteen-person Board of Directors, seven of which are elected by the membership, including three by the elite athlete player segment, five of which are appointed by existing board members, including three which must be independent in connections to the organization, and an ex-officio position for the Chief Executive Officer who is hired by the board and is also head of the staff.  Officers are elected by board members on an annual basis.  Each appointed and elected director's term is three years, rotated such that four seats come up for election each calendar year.  The Board is responsible for overseeing the Chief Executive Officer, budgeting, strategic planning, setting organizational policies and serving on various working groups that include Equity & Diversity, Audit & Ethics, Nominating, Investment, Marketing, Strategic Planning, et al.

Nearly 55,000 people joined as members of USA Ultimate in 2016, the largest membership year so far.  Memberships for a single calendar year cost $56.50 per calendar year for adults and college students, $39.50 per year for coaches ($69.50 for a combined coach/player), $34.50 per year for Youth players under 19 years old who have not yet graduated from high school, $27.50 for Friends & Family members and $16.50 for local Affiliate-only recreational participants. Multiyear discounts are available for most levels. A lifetime membership is also available for $950. Membership covers voting in board elections; seeking election to the board of directors; participation at sanctioned and championship events; accident and liability insurance in those events; attendance at USA Ultimate education clinics; certification options at various levels of coaching, tournament directing and officiating (called "observing"); discounts with several partner sponsors; scholarship opportunities; access to the USA Ultimate mobile app to follow events, access the rules, event guides for national championships, and report scores for sanctioned events; access to the quarterly USA Ultimate magazine, monthly electronic newsletters, and weekly email updates; and discounted USA Ultimate merchandise.

USA Ultimate is a member of the World Flying Disc Federation, the international governing body for flying disc sports.  WFDF is a member of the General Association for International Sport Federations (GAISF), The International World Games Association (IWGA), and the International Council of Sport Science and Physical Education (ICSSPE), as well as an officially recognized International Federation by the International Olympic Committee (IOC).

Championship series history

Club and Masters National Championships

US Open Ultimate Championships

College Championships

Youth Club Championships

High school regional championships

Youth championships

The Callahan Award
The Callahan Award is an annual award given by The Callahan Award committee, with assistance from USA Ultimate, to the best male and female college ultimate players. In addition to honoring extraordinary physical talent and skills, the Callahan Award also honors sportsmanship and leadership. Each Open and Women's team can nominate a single player for the award. Beginning in 2000, players could also be nominated for the Callahan by USA Ultimate college regional coordinators.

The winners are selected through online balloting by other college ultimate players. The award is named after Henry Callahan, one of the early pioneers and ambassadors of ultimate. The Callahan Award was initially created by Charles Kerr and was first awarded in 1996.

Past Callahan winners

The Donovan Award
The Donovan Award is named after the late Kelly Donovan, who captured the spirit, talent, and commitment to growing the sport that we are looking for in the ideal winners of this award. We are honored for the Donovan Award to help carry on Kelly’s legacy.

The Donovan Award will be awarded to one Women's and one Men's player in Division III who are selected by their peers. The ideal candidate for the award meets the following criteria:

 Demonstrates an exceptional level of skill and athleticism on the field.
 Upholds the principles of Spirit of the Game, equity, and fairness in their own actions, as well as holding teammates accountable to do the same.
 Is a leader off the field, both on their team and in the greater ultimate community.

Past Donovan winners

Ultimate Hall of Fame
Source: 
Source:

Men

Women

Special Merit

See also
 List of Ultimate teams
 Disc Northwest
 Ultimate Canada
 Ken Westerfield
 Flying disc games
 Ultimate (sport)

References

External links
The USA Ultimate Homepage
Callahan Award Website
USA Ultimate 11th Edition Rules
World Flying Disc Federation
Ultimate Hall of Fame

Ultimate (sport) governing bodies
Ultimate
Sports organizations established in 1979